"Sister Suffragette" is a pro-suffrage protest song pastiche sung by actress Glynis Johns while playing Mrs. Winifred Banks in the 1964 Disney film Mary Poppins. The song's melody was originally from a scrapped piece called "Practically Perfect", and both that song and "Sister Suffragette" were written and composed by Richard M. Sherman and Robert B. Sherman.

The lyrics mention Emmeline Pankhurst, who with her daughters Christabel and Sylvia founded the Women's Social and Political Union in Manchester, England. Some of the words are: "Our daughters' daughters will adore us, and they'll sing in grateful chorus, well done, Sister Suffragette!"

Original version
"Sister Suffragette"'s melody was borrowed from an earlier song entitled "Practically Perfect", which had already been deleted from the 1964 film production.  According to the songwriters in their autobiographical book, Walt's Time, actress Glynis Johns thought she was being offered the title role of "Mary Poppins" when in fact she had been signed to play "Mrs. Banks".  To amplify Disney's and Johns' mutual embarrassment, the misunderstanding only became apparent as both parties sat opposite each other in Walt Disney's Burbank studio-lot office. Thinking quickly, Disney softened Johns' disappointment of not getting the film's title role by telling her of the 'terrific new song' which the Sherman Brothers had written especially for her.  Disney called up the songwriters to tell them that he was "just about to take Johns to lunch and how she was looking forward to hearing the new song following the meal", all within earshot of the actress.  The Sherman Brothers deciphered Disney's coded hint, worked feverishly through their own lunch hour, and wrote "Sister Suffragette". For instance, the original lyric:

Quickly evolved into:

The 2004 Mary Poppins stage musical contains a song titled "Practically Perfect" which, while being heavily based on the original, contains none of the tune. The replacement song is instead called "Being Mrs. Banks".

Literary sources
 Sherman, Robert B. Walt's Time: from before to beyond. Santa Clarita: Camphor Tree Publishers, 1998.

1964 songs
Songs from Mary Poppins
Protest songs
Songs about activists
Songs written by the Sherman Brothers
Women's suffrage
Cultural depictions of Emmeline Pankhurst